The Men's artistic team all-around gymnastics competition at the 2014 Commonwealth Games in Glasgow, Scotland was held on 28 and 29 July at the Scottish Exhibition and Conference Centre.

Team Competition

Qualification results

Individual all-around

Floor

Pommel horse

Rings

Vault

Parallel bars

Horizontal bar

References

Gymnastics at the 2014 Commonwealth Games